Parbati Barua is an Assamese politician, animal conservation activist and a Mahout (Indian term for an elephant tamer and caretaker), Born as one of nine children to late Prakritish Chandra Barua of the Royal Family Of Gauripur. Prakritish was the last member of the Rajahs of Gauripur to hold power. She came to the limelight after the BBC created the documentary "Queen of the Elephants" based on her life, along with the companion book by Mark Shand. She resides in Guwahati and is also a member of the Asian Elephant Specialist Group, IUCN. She is the sister of Pratima Barua Pandey and niece of filmmaker Pramathesh Barua of Devdas fame.

Early life

Parbarti was born as one of nine children born to late Prakritish Barua, the last in line of the Rajahs of Gauripur. Since childhood she had a keen sense of understanding and interest in elephants and spent much of her time in the jungles along with her father. Prakritish was an eccentric hunter and had a supernatural understanding of elephants and had 40 elephants in his royal stables.

He used to take his family on extended trips in the forests with a large entourage that included servants, cooks and a private tutor for his children and his family which consisted of his 4 wives and 9 children. It's on these trips that in the words of Parbati herself, she partly developed her interest in elephants. In 1970, the abolition of privy purse dealt a heavy blow to Parbati and her family.

Now not entitled to any of the tax-free regimes and money allotted to them, the line of Rajahs of Gauripur came to an end – both in terms of power and benefits. Being essentially broke with nothing but his palace and his stable of elephants remaining, Prakritish with his daughter returned to the forests and survived by selling elephants and providing their services to timber businesses directly or through the Sonepur Fair.

At the age of 14, Barua caught her first wild elephant on which her father congratulated get. Since then she has mastered the art of rounding up elephants and capturing them to be domesticated. Over the years, she has been called multiple times in the jungles, tea plantations and rural areas of West Bengal, Odisha and her native Assam to capture or take care of wild elephants.

See also
Mela shikar

References

Indian conservationists
People from Dhubri district
People from Guwahati
Living people
Women conservationists
Indian female royalty
Indian women environmentalists
Women from Assam
Activists from Assam
20th-century Indian women
20th-century Indian people
20th-century Indian royalty
1954 births